Love Hate Love is a 1971 American made-for-television drama film starring Ryan O'Neal.

Reception
The Los Angeles Times called the film "for the most part, improbably developed...O'Neal... is the main strength of this movie."

The movie was the seventh highest rating show of the week in the US, with a rating of 26.8. It was ABC's most popular show of the week.  It was repeated in June and rated 20.7 one of the top ten shows in the country that week.

References

External links

Love Hate Love at TCMDB
Review of film

1971 television films
1971 films
ABC Movie of the Week
Films produced by Aaron Spelling
Films directed by George McCowan
Films scored by Lyn Murray